Vicente "Vincent" S. Pérez Jr. (born May 26, 1958) is a Filipino environment advocate and renewable energy investor.

Education
Pérez entered the University of the Philippines and was active in extra-curricular activities, becoming national president of AIESEC Philippines, the national chapter of the international association of business and economics students. He graduated with a degree in Business Economics in 1980.
After his college graduation, he took an AIESEC internship with the international department of New Jersey National Bank in Trenton New Jersey. Pérez then earned his MBA at the Wharton School of Business of the University of Pennsylvania in 1983, majoring in international finance.

Career

Financial career
Upon graduation from Wharton, he joined Mellon Bank's International Banking Department in Pittsburgh and completed their international credit training program. Pérez was assigned as a Latin American credit analyst and later as Mexico and Central America desk officer. In 1985, he joined Mellon's debt trading team, and was one of the early pioneers in emerging markets debt trading, focusing on Latin American and Philippine debt.

In 1986, Pérez then joined Lazard Brothers & Co in London as part of its debt trading team. The following year he moved to  Lazard Frères & Co. in New York as a debt trader and investment banker. At 35, he became a general partner of Lazard Frères in 1994 as co-head with Edgar Legaspi of its Emerging Markets Group, becoming one of the highest-ranking Asian bankers on Wall Street, and was named one of the 100 Emerging Markets Superstars by Global Finance magazine.  In 1994, Pérez relocated to Singapore as one of the founding managing directors of Lazard Asia.

In 1997, Pérez left Lazard to set up Next Century Partners, a private equity firm based in Singapore, teaming up with Patrick Go, Dennis Mendiola, John Wallace, and Eduardo Martinez-Miranda. They invested in companies such as Smart Communications, Del Monte Pacific, and in semiconductor assembly.  Among the co-investors of Next Century Partners were Soros Fund, Mitsui, and one of the Bass Brothers of Fort Worth Texas.

Political advisor
In early 2001 Pérez was recruited by his former academic adviser and newly sworn Philippine president Gloria Macapagal Arroyo to join her administration.  He served briefly as Undersecretary for Industry at the Department of Trade and Industry and as Managing Head of the Board of Investments. He then served from 2001 to 2005 in the Cabinet of Gloria Macapagal Arroyo as Energy Secretary.  As Energy Secretary, Pérez boosted energy self-sufficiency, promoted clean indigenous energy, and crafted an ambitious renewable policy framework. He dealt with solving the frequent grid-wide power black-outs that were hampering the economy then, and had to secure the oil supply of the country in the wake of the 2003 Iraq war by pursuing energy diplomacy in Asia and the Middle East.  As chair of an ASEAN Energy Ministers meeting, Pérez led the ASEAN Plan of Action for Energy Cooperation for 2004–2009, setting for the first time a regional commitment to attain a minimum 10% of power mix in renewable energy. He hosted the first ministerial meeting of ASEAN plus 3 (China, Japan, and Korea) energy ministers in June 2004. After overseeing a major restructuring of the Philippine power sector and having initiated the privatization of generation assets of the state-owned National Power Corporation, he resigned in March 2005. With four years of government service,  Pérez was one of the longest-serving members of President Arroyo's economic team, and was cited as the last of her "touted trio of Wall Street-bred economic managers".

In announcing his resignation, the Palace issued a statement from President Arroyo citing Pérez's "crucial role in implementing difficult power sector reforms, reorganizing the public energy sector, jump-starting the much-awaited privatization of Napocor, and ensuring no more Luzon-wide blackouts since May 2002". The President underscored the "valuable contributions made by Secretary Pérez in the country’s quest for energy independence through greater reliance on clean, indigenous and sustainable energy sources", noting that since 2001, the country has increased its use of indigenous natural gas and geothermal power.

Return to private sector
Since his return to the private sector in 2005, Pérez has been active in renewable power, energy advisory, and conservation issues. He was a 2005 World Fellow at Yale University, where he lectured an MBA class on renewable power in emerging countries.  Upon his return in 2006, Pérez and former energy officials Jocot de Dios and Lea Ricolcol, founded Merritt Partners, an energy advisory firm.  That same year, he was invited by the owners of NorthWind, the first wind farm in Southeast Asia, to replace a minority shareholder, and that led him to a decade-long career investing in renewable energy. In 2008, together with Knud Hedeager, Gerry Magbanua, Poch Ambrosio (all former colleagues from NorthWind), and joined by Antonette de Guzman and Eduardo Martinez-Miranda, Pérez and his partners founded Alternergy, a renewable power company focused on wind and run-of-the-river hydro, and built the Pililla Rizal wind farm in partnership with Equis Funds. Subsequently, in 2013, he co-founded Solar Pacific, a solar PV developer, with Michael Lichtenfeld, a Yale colleague, and the Sant Foundation. As a private citizen, he was dispatched as Special Presidential Envoy by President Arroyo on economic diplomacy overseas.  In 2009, Pérez was appointed as vice chairman of the National Renewable Energy Board.

Independent business activities
Pérez has been an independent director of regional companies in Australia, the Philippines, and Singapore. He is an independent director of ST Telemedia, the Temasek holding company for telecom, data centers and mobile technology, and an Independent Board Director of Banco de Oro, the Philippines’ largest domestic bank. He is a member of the advisory boards of Bhutan Foundation, New Zealand Trade Enterprise, Geneva-based Pictet Clean Energy Fund, and the Yale Center for Business and Environment.

Pérez and his family have had a long affinity with the frontier island of Palawan in western Philippines. He and his brother Miguel set up Stellar Sea Farms to raise red tilapia in sea cages in Culion. They once owned Puerco island in Green Island Bay and currently own Dilumacad or Helicopter island in El Nido. In 2000, he founded Asian Conservation Company, an innovative venture philanthropy with like-minded conservationists, and together they acquired El Nido Resorts. With a management team from Next Century Partners, they transformed it into an award-winning eco-tourism destination in Palawan by pursuing a quadruple bottom line philosophy.

Philanthropy
His philanthropy is dedicated to the environment and conservation. Pérez has long been involved with World Wide Fund for Nature (WWF) starting with arranging debt-for-nature swaps. He was a founding trustee of WWF-Philippines in 1996. Pérez was elected to the International Board of WWF, the governing body of the global WWF network, and a member of the boards of WWF-China and WWF-US.  He was active with Malampaya Foundation, Sikat Solar Car Challenge Foundation, Stiftung Solarenergie Foundation, and in marine conservation through Asian Conservation Foundation.

Writings
Pérez has written a few publications: “Chasing Moonlight” narrated a sailing voyage during his 50th year; “Chasing Sunsets”, a compilation of 58 haiku poetry of his travels; and “Chasing Cherry Blossoms”, a hiking travelogue with his three brothers in Japan. He co-published “Voices from the Islands” featuring how El Nido Resorts became a showcase of sustainable tourism.

Personal life
He is the eldest of five children of Vicente Abad Pérez Sr., a former naval officer and assistant secretary for foreign affairs, and Lucila Siongco Santiago, a dietician and nutritionist by training. His sister Sheila became a missionary, a brother Benedict is a leading Asian equity sales banker in New York, another brother Raoul is an aviation expert, while a third brother Miguel is a fintech entrepreneur. He and his brothers were educated by the Jesuits at Xavier School.

Pérez and his wife, Maria Adora, reside in Manila and Melbourne, and they have three sons and one daughter.

Pérez is fond of the sea and used to do salt-water fishing and sailing. Together with his sailing buddy Judes Echauz, they won the Rolex China Sea Race on their yacht Subic Centennial, first in 1998 and again in 2008.

References

1958 births
Living people
Filipino bankers
21st-century Filipino businesspeople
University of the Philippines alumni
Wharton School of the University of Pennsylvania alumni
Secretaries of Energy of the Philippines
Arroyo administration cabinet members